Zuid- en Noord-Schermer is a former municipality in the Dutch province of North Holland. It existed until 1970, when it became a part of the municipality of Schermer.

References

Former municipalities of North Holland